The Prayer Book Society of the USA (PBS USA), officially the Society for the Preservation of the Book of Common Prayer, seeks to maintain the Anglican tradition of liturgical common prayer and promote the use and understanding of traditional versions of the Book of Common Prayer such as the American edition of 1928.

A related society is the Prayer Book Society of Canada. There are additional groups in Britain and Australia.

The late Peter Toon was a president and CEO of the society. Many of his articles can still be found at its website.

See also

Prayer Book Society (England)

External links
 

Book of Common Prayer